Rugby Club Balkan Mosquito, (Serbian: Рагби клуб Балкански комарац) is a rugby union team from Belgrade, Serbia. The club is a member of the Rugby Union of Serbia.  The team wears a black and green strip.

History 
In June 1984, a group of enthusiasts and lovers of rugby led by Milanko Predrag founded Ragbi Klub Balkanski Komarac.

Club honours 
Rugby Cup of SR Yugoslavia:
Runner-up (2):  1994,1996

Current squad 
Senior Squad:

External links

References

Serbian rugby union teams